Haruo Ignacio Remeliik (1 June 1933 – 30 June 1985) was a politician from Palau. He served as the first President of Palau from 2 March 1981 until his assassination on 30 June 1985. He is buried at Kloulklubed in his home state of Peleliu. Remeliik was of mixed Japanese and Palauan descent.

Early life
Remeliik studied priesthood in Truk. Later he returned to Palau and became an associate judge. In 1968, he won a seat in Palau legislature and became vice speaker. In 1970 he was appointed as deputy district administrator for the Palau district of the Trust Territory of the Pacific Islands. In 1978 he became a member and later also president of the constitutional convention. In 1980, he was elected as the first President of Palau, and he won re-election in 1984.

Death
Remeliik's killers remain unknown. Remeliik was shot in the driveway of his home by an unidentified gunman. Six months after the killing, two relatives of Roman Tmetuchl and another man were arrested in connection to the killing; however, they were later released. In March 2000, former presidential candidate and convicted felon John O. Ngiraked claimed responsibility for the conspiracy to kill Remeliik.

Allegations of CIA involvement 
There have been persistent allegations that Remeliik was killed by the CIA due to his firm anti-nuclear stance.

See also
List of unsolved murders

References

External links
 

1933 births
1985 deaths
Assassinated heads of government
Assassinated heads of state
Assassinated Palauan politicians
Burials in Palau
Deaths by firearm in Palau
Male murder victims
Palauan politicians of Japanese descent
People from Peleliu
People murdered in Palau
Presidents of Palau
Unsolved murders in Palau
20th-century Palauan politicians